Michael Robert Willesee,  (29 June 1942 – 1 March 2019) was an Australian television journalist, interviewer and presenter.

Early life and family

Willesee was born the son of politician, Western Australian ALP senator and foriegn minister Don Willesee who served during the tenure of the Whitlam Government and his wife Gwendoline Clark Willeesee.

Willesse's brother's are Don Willesse Jnr., and Terry Willesee, A TV presenter and journalist. He was the father of Amy and Michael Willesee Jr., who is also a journalist and another daughter Kate Willesse who is a chiropractor. His son Michael Jr is married to television host and reporter Allison Langdon and he was also the father-in-law of journalist and writer Mark Whittaker. His niece is cyclist and author  Janet Shaw, Terry's biological daughter.

Career

Mike first came to prominence in 1967 as a reporter for then-new nightly current affairs program This Day Tonight (TDT), where his aggressive style quickly earned him a reputation as a fearless political interviewer.

Willesee figured prominently in the controversy that erupted over the decision in early 1967 by the Liberal government, led by Prime Minister Harold Holt, not to reappoint the ABC Chairman Dr James Darling. This decision was rumoured to have been the result of the government's anger over critical coverage of its policies on the ABC. 

Willesee's own critical comments about the decision on TDT on 2 April further angered Holt, who questioned the ABC's impartiality and implied that Willesee (whose father Don Willesee was a Labor Senator) was politically biased. Holt's remarks backfired, as they provoked strong protests from both Willesee and the Australian Journalists' Association.

After TDT, Willesee hosted the current affairs program Four Corners from 1969 to 1971. 

He then moved to the Nine Network, where he hosted A Current Affair when it debuted in 1971. While at A Current Affair, Willesee noticed the talent of a young Australian comedian, Paul Hogan, who had appeared on the amateur talent program New Faces in 1971, and he invited Hogan to make regular 5-minute appearances on the show. Hogan would perform skits and make humorous comments on some issue of the day. During this period, Hogan befriended A Current Affair producer John Cornell, who became Hogan's collaborator, long-term manager, business partner, and close friend.

Willesee later left Nine for a role as news and current affairs director at the 0–10 Network (now known as Network 10), where he also presented a weekly interview program.

He joined the Seven Network in 1975 and hosted the first Australian version of This Is Your Life. He also presented a nightly current affairs program called Willesee at Seven which claimed a victory over A Current Affair in the same timeslot and led to that program being axed in 1978. Willesee at Seven later to become Willesee '81 and Willesee '82 before it ended in 1982 but Willesee began to produce documentaries for the network. 

He was known for a long-running friendship with a disabled boy named Quentin Kenihan, who had osteogenesis imperfecta. He was also known for sparring with the Orange People, who recruited in Australia during the 1980s. In 1987 the Committee of Skeptical Inquiry (CSICOP) presented Willesee with the Responsibility in Journalism award.

He returned to Nine in 1984 to revisit the nightly current affairs genre with Willesee as well as producing specials for the network, winning a Logie for Most Popular Documentary in 1986.
One of the most significant interviews conducted by Willesee was the famous Birthday Cake Interview in 1993, with then leader of the Liberal Party, John Hewson. With the 1993 Federal Election to take place in only ten days, Willesee asked Hewson numerous questions about the proposed Goods and Services Tax (GST) that the Coalition wished to introduce. Hewson struggled to answer the simple question of whether a birthday cake would cost more or less under his government as a result of the GST. Willesee's unrelenting questioning along with Hewson's indecisive answers and his frequent stuttering made it appear that Hewson had little understanding of one of his own major policies. Hewson would go on to lose the election against Paul Keating and the Coalition would remain out of government for three more years, Many political analysts believed that the interview cost Hewson's chance of winning what his supporters dubbed the 'unloseable election'. However, others counter that opinion polls held up until election day still predicted a Coalition victory.

In 1993, Willesee received public outrage for his controversial action of interviewing, via phone, two young children, a brother 11 and his sister 9 who were being held hostage, during the 1993 Cangai siege. Many held the opinion that his actions were reckless and endangered the children's lives. This event was subsequently parodied by ABC TV's Frontline where main character Mike Moore interviewed a gunman and his hostage daughter. In the final scene of this episode, Mike interviews, live on air, another gunman in another siege who, much to Mike's horror, subsequently shoots each of his hostages, the sounds of which are played live across Australia.

Willesee is remembered by many Australians for the night when, filling in for Jana Wendt on A Current Affair, he fronted the show while appearing to be under the influence of alcohol. He claimed he was on medication, tired and emotional.

In his fifties Willesee rediscovered the Roman Catholic faith of his upbringing. He has reported on religious topics and in 1998 he made a report entitled Signs From God on the appearance of stigmata displayed by a woman, Katya Revas, in Bolivia. This documentary was watched by an audience of 28 million in the United States. In 1999, Willesee won the Bent Spoon Award from the Australian Skeptics for Signs From God. The rationale for Willesee receiving the award was that the show was "seeking to capitalise on the irrational millennial fears of many people".

In 2002, Willesee became the 19th inductee into the TV Week Logies Hall of Fame.

On 21 August 2006 Willesee appeared on Andrew Denton's TV show Enough Rope and spoke about his dedication to discovering what science can ascertain about the Shroud of Turin; specifically, whether it contains the blood of Jesus Christ.

In 2012, Willesee joined the Seven Network's Sunday Night to do high-profile interviews. His first encounter was with Prime Minister Julia Gillard. In early 2013 he interviewed billionaire casino owner James Packer.

Personal life

Wife Carol Willesse's casting as Home and Away's original Pippa Fletcher

Willesee's second wife was Scottish-born Australian Carol Willesee (nee Brent), whom he married  in 1976, a former model. Brent had started modelling at sixteen and married a schoolteacher and moved to Singapore, but was divorced after four years. After living in Sydney, Australia and her married to Willesee she again took up modelling, but instead decided she wanted to become an actress and trained a 3 year drama course at the Ensemble Acting Studio. post graduation she appeared in a stage production "Never in My Lifetime", to rave reviews, after which she received numerous acting offers, but turned them down due to unsuitability. 

Carol however was offered what she called the opportunity of a lifetime, when her agent June Cann, suggested her for an upcoming TV series to be launched by the Seven Network called Home and Away, in the role of foster mother  Pippa Fletcher, she was  excepted the role with series producer John Holmes stating "Carol has a big future in television", after which she had filmed scenes for the pilot episodes (which were later reshot with Vanessa Downing), but finding the filming schelule to hectic and also requested a clause in her contract so she could spend a certain number of hours per week with her real family. This was not permissable as she was required on set as obliged with creator Alan Bateman, stating tyou do not make TV serials from 9.00 and 3.30, Bateman was also furious with the soap losing revunue with the delay in production, but was happy with at least the local and international publicity the scandal created, with headlines such as "Willesee Wife Quits and "Carol loses TV Role"  Struck off from the role, the role was recast immediately and given to Vanessa Downing, who had attended the initial auditions. with Caroles scene all reshoot with Downing.

Downing's background was as a highly experienced theatre actress, who was also a singer, at the time performing a acapella group at the Sydney Opera House, whilst filming Home and Away by day. She stated at the time she do was surprised by the workload, as an experienced actress, so could understand that Carol had found the schelule overwhelming, considering she was very inexperianced.

Carol Willesee died in 2006, aged 59, from Creutzfeldt–Jakob disease, after being misdiagnosed.

In 2017, Michael Willesee spoke about his battle with throat cancer on the TV program Australian Story. He also revealed how he had returned to his Catholic faith after years away from the church. On 1 March 2019, Willesee died of throat cancer in Sydney, New South Wales, Australia at the age of 76.

References

External links
 

1942 births
2019 deaths
Australian television journalists
Australian television presenters
Logie Award winners
Officers of the Order of Australia
Australian Roman Catholics
Deaths from throat cancer